David Josef Bach (13 August 1874 – 30 January 1947) was an Austrian journalist, music critic, and an influential figure in the cultural life of early twentieth-century Vienna.

Early life and friend of Arnold Schoenberg 
Bach was born in 1874 in Lvov (then Lemberg, capital of Austrian Galicia) to Jewish parents.  As a boy, Bach was a close friend of the young Arnold Schoenberg, who later named him as one of the three friends (the other two were Oskar Adler and Alexander von Zemlinsky) who greatly influenced him in his youthful explorations of music and literature. Describing him as "A linguist, a philosopher, a connoisseur of literature, and a mathematician" as well as "a good musician", Schoenberg paid tribute to his friend by claiming that it was D.J. Bach who furnished his character with "the ethical and moral power needed to withstand vulgarity and commonplace popularity" ('My Evolution', 1949).

Early studies and career 
After studying Natural Sciences at the University of Vienna, where he was influenced by Ernst Mach, D.J. Bach became a journalist, being appointed as music critic of the Arbeiter-Zeitung ('Worker's Newspaper') in 1904 after the death of Josef Scheu (1841–1904). As a loyal supporter of Schoenberg and of the slightly older Gustav Mahler he supported contemporary music in a city where performances of 'modern' works would sometimes be disrupted by noisy protests.

Socialist 
An active socialist dedicated to making the arts accessible to the working classes, it was D.J. Bach who instituted the Arbeiter-Symphonie-Konzerte ('Workers' Symphony Concerts') in Vienna in 1905. His wide-ranging activities earned him the hostility of right-wing groups, who denounced his artistic programme as part of a 'Jewish conspiracy' to undermine traditional Austrian culture. Such accusations were all the more vehement because D.J. Bach was also one of the earliest members of the Vienna Psychoanalytical Association which met under the aegis of Sigmund Freud and whose members were mostly Jewish.

Editor-in-chief of the Arbeiter-Zeitung 
D.J. Bach was made editor-in-chief of the literature and art section of the Arbeiter-Zeitung in 1917. Once the Social Democratic Party came to power in 1919, however, he became highly influential politically. Immediately appointed Director of the Sozialdemokratische Kunststelle ('Social-Democratic Arts Council'), he was able to develop a dynamic programme of cultural events as an integral part of the programme of socialist reconstruction in so-called 'Red Vienna'. He organized readings for the workers of Vienna by the satirist Karl Kraus; in 1933, commissioned a painting by Oskar Kokoschka of the Wilhelminenberg Kinderheim, with its panoramic view of the City of Vienna; and invited the avant-garde stage designer Frederick Kiesler to construct a full-sized experimental stage – the 'Raumbühne' – in the Konzerthaus. The organization of the Theatre and Music Festival of the City of Vienna in 1924 was one of the high points of his career. But he also – year in, year out – made major musical and theatrical productions available to working-class audiences through a system of subsidized block bookings. In order to help the Workers to be better prepared for the Concerts, Operas or Plays they were planning to attend, from 1926 to 1931, the 'Kunststelle' issued a monthly Arts' magazine, 'Kunst und Volk', in which distinguished contributors from all around Europe discussed not only the artistic events in question, but also a broad range of historical, political and social matters.

Music 
Music was, and remained, his central focus, and it was he who founded the amateur Vienna Singverein ('Vienna Choral Society') in 1919. This organisation, together with the Arbeiter-Symphonie-Konzerte and the 'Workers' Music Conservatoire', flourished until all were disbanded upon the new fascist government's outlawing of the Social Democratic Party and imposition of an authoritarian constitution in 1934. Anton Webern was active as a conductor of all musical organisations, and developed a close and enduring friendship with D.J. Bach: it was Bach who delivered the address which opened the concert of Webern's music given on 3 December 1933 to celebrate the composer's fiftieth birthday, and Bach who persuaded Webern not to resign from his position as president of the Vienna International Society for Contemporary Music (ISCM) chapter when his projected performance of Alban Berg's opera Wozzeck in Florence in 1934 was cancelled for political reasons.

Cultural politics 
D.J. Bach can be said to have held a unique position in the cultural politics of Vienna. In a situation of increasing polarization between 'Right' and 'Left', he attempted to create a cultural consensus by including conservatives like Hofmannsthal and Kralik in his system of patronage, as well as radicals like Ernst Fischer and Alban Berg. The esteem in which he was held by the Viennese cultural community is reflected in the collection of eighty-eight large-format literary, artistic and musical dedications in a "Kassette" presented to him in August 1924 on the occasion of his fiftieth birthday. This collection, now in the care of Gonville and Caius College, Cambridge, includes original artistic works of considerable value and forms a unique 'time capsule' of Viennese cultural life.

Move to London and death 
In 1939 David Bach, his wife Gisela and nephew Herbert, emigrated to London. In England he became a leading member of the Austrian Labour Club and President of the Union of Austrian Journalists. He continued to organize musical events, particularly concerts of chamber music, supported by members of the future Amadeus Quartet.

Bach died in London in 1947.

Further reading 
 Arnold Schoenberg, Style and Idea, ed. Leonard Stein, trans. Leo Black (London, 1975).
 Henriette Kotlan-Werner, Kunst und Volk: David Josef Bach 1874–1947 (Vienna, 1977).
 Jared Armstrong and Edward Timms, 'Souvenirs of Vienna 1924: The Legacy of David Josef Bach', in Austrian Studies: Culture and Politics in Red Vienna, Vol.14 (2006), 61-98.
 Piero Violante, Eredità della musica.David J. Bach e i concerti sinfonici dei lavoratori viennesi,1905-1934;Sellerio editore,Palermo 2007,pp. 227

References 

1874 births
1947 deaths
People from the Kingdom of Galicia and Lodomeria
Jews from Galicia (Eastern Europe)
Austro-Hungarian Jews
Journalists from Vienna
Jewish emigrants from Austria to the United Kingdom after the Anschluss